Schwerzenbach is a railway station in the Swiss canton of Zurich. It is situated in the municipality of Schwerzenbach on the Wallisellen–Uster–Rapperswil line.

It is the main station serving the communities of Schwerzenbach and Volketswil, with close proximity to the Volkiland shopping center and Milandia entertainment park. As of 2019 the station offers an SBB office and a Migrolino convenience store.

Service 
Schwerzenbach station is served by Zürich S-Bahn lines S9 and S14. During weekends, there is also a nighttime S-Bahn service (SN9) offered by ZVV. Rail services are summarized as follows:

 Zürich S-Bahn:
 Nighttime S-Bahn (only during weekends):

References

External links 
 

Railway stations in the canton of Zürich
Swiss Federal Railways stations